Merle Oberon (born Estelle Merle O'Brien Thompson; 19 February 191123 November 1979) was a British actress who began her film career in British films as Anne Boleyn in The Private Life of Henry VIII (1933). After her success in The Scarlet Pimpernel (1934), she travelled to the United States to make films for Samuel Goldwyn. She was nominated for the Academy Award for Best Actress for her performance in The Dark Angel (1935). Her nomination made her the first Asian actress to have received a nomination for the Academy Award for Best Actress. Oberon hid her mixed heritage out of fear of discrimination and the impact it would have had on her career.

She was perhaps best known for her portrayal of Catherine Earnshaw in the 1939 film adaptation of the novel Wuthering Heights directed by William Wyler.

Her other notable films are These Three (1936), A Song to Remember (1945), Berlin Express (1948) and Désirée (1954).

A traffic collision in 1937 caused facial injuries that could have ended her career, but she recovered and remained active in film and television until 1973.

Early life
Estelle Merle O'Brien Thompson was born in Bombay, British India, on 19 February 1911. Merle was given "Queenie" as a nickname, in honour of Queen Mary, who visited India along with King George V in 1911.

Parentage
For most of her life, Merle protected herself by concealing the truth about her parentage, claiming that she had been born in Tasmania, Australia, and that her birth records had been destroyed in a fire.

She was raised as the daughter of Arthur Terrence O'Brien Thompson, a Welsh mechanical engineer from Darlington who worked in Indian Railways and his wife, Charlotte Selby, a Eurasian from Ceylon (now Sri Lanka). However, according to her birth certificate, Merle's biological mother was Charlotte's then-12-year-old daughter, Constance. To avoid scandal, Charlotte raised Merle as Constance's half-sister. Charlotte had herself given birth to Constance at the age of 14 as the result of rape by Henry Alfred Selby, the Anglo-Irish foreman of a tea plantation. In their 1983 biography of Oberon, Charles Higham and Roy Moseley also wrote that Selby had Māori ancestry, though the iwi was not known.

Constance married Alexander Soares and had four other children: Edna, Douglas, Harry, and Stanislaus (Stan). Edna and Douglas moved to the UK at an early age. Stanislaus was the only child to keep his father's surname of Soares. He lived in Surrey, British Columbia, Canada. Harry eventually moved to Toronto, Canada, retaining Charlotte’s maiden name, Selby. When Harry tracked down Merle's birth certificate in Indian government records in Bombay, he was surprised to discover that he was in fact Merle's half-brother, not her nephew. He attempted to visit her in Los Angeles, but she refused to see him. Harry withheld that information from Oberon's biographer Charles Higham, and eventually revealed it only to Maree Delofski, who made the 2002 documentary The Trouble with Merle, produced by the Australian Broadcasting Corporation, which investigated the various conflicting versions of Merle's origin.

New Zealand author Witi Ihimaera used Oberon's hidden South Asian and alleged Māori heritage as the inspiration for the novel White Lies, which was turned into the 2013 movie White Lies.

Youth
In 1914, when Merle was 3, Arthur Thompson joined the British Army and later died of pneumonia on the Western Front during the Battle of the Somme. Merle and Charlotte led an impoverished existence in shabby flats in Bombay for a few years. Then, in 1917, they moved to better circumstances in Calcutta (now Kolkata). Oberon received a foundation scholarship to attend La Martiniere Calcutta for Girls, one of the best private schools in Calcutta. There she was constantly taunted for her mixed ethnicity, eventually leading her to quit school and receive lessons at home.

Oberon first performed with the Calcutta Amateur Dramatic Society. She was also completely enamored with films and enjoyed going out to nightclubs. Indian journalist Sunanda K. Datta-Ray said that Merle worked as a telephone operator in Calcutta under the name Queenie Thomson, and won a contest at Firpo's Restaurant there, before the outset of her film career.

In Firpo's in 1929, Merle met a former actor, Colonel Ben Finney, and dated him; however, when he saw Charlotte one night at her flat, he realized Oberon was of mixed ancestry and ended the relationship. However, Finney promised to introduce her to Rex Ingram of Victorine Studios (whom he had known through his relationship with the late Barbara La Marr), if she were prepared to travel to France, which she readily did. After packing all their belongings and moving to France, Oberon and her mother found that their supposed benefactor avoided them, although he had left a good word for Oberon with Ingram at the studios in Nice. Ingram liked Oberon's exotic appearance and quickly hired her to be an extra in a party scene in a film named The Three Passions.

Acting career

Oberon arrived in England for the first time in 1928, aged 17. She worked as a club hostess under the name Queenie O'Brien and played in minor and unbilled roles in various films. "I couldn't dance or sing or write or paint. The only possible opening seemed to be in some line in which I could use my face. This was, in fact, no better than a hundred other faces, but it did possess a fortunately photogenic quality," she told a journalist at Film Weekly in 1939. 

Her film career received a major boost when director Alexander Korda took an interest and gave her a small but prominent role, under the name Merle Oberon, as Anne Boleyn in The Private Life of Henry VIII (1933) opposite Charles Laughton. The film became a major success and she was then given leading roles, such as Lady Blakeney in The Scarlet Pimpernel (1934) with Leslie Howard, who became her lover for a while.

Oberon's career benefited from her relationship with, and later marriage to, Korda. He sold "shares" of her contract to producer Samuel Goldwyn, who gave her good vehicles in Hollywood.  Her "mother" stayed behind in England. Oberon earned her sole Academy Award for Best Actress nomination for The Dark Angel (1935) produced by Goldwyn. Around this time she had a serious romance with David Niven, and according to one biographer even wanted to marry him, but he was not faithful to her.

She was selected to star in Korda's 1937 film, I, Claudius, as Messalina, but her injuries in a car accident resulted in the film being abandoned. She went on to appear as Cathy in the highly acclaimed film Wuthering Heights (opposite Laurence Olivier; 1939), as George Sand in A Song to Remember (1945) and as the Empress Josephine in Désirée (1954).

According to Princess Merle, the biography written by Charles Higham with Roy Moseley, Oberon suffered damage to her complexion in 1940 from a combination of cosmetic poisoning and an allergic reaction to sulfa drugs. Alexander Korda sent her to a skin specialist in New York City, where she underwent several dermabrasion procedures. The results were only partially successful; her face had become noticeably pitted and indented unless concealed by makeup.

Personal life

Charlotte Selby, Oberon's birth grandmother, raised Oberon as her daughter until her death in 1937. Merle's biological mother was Charlotte's daughter, Constance, who was 12 years old when Merle was born. In 1949, Oberon commissioned paintings of Charlotte based on an old photograph (but depicting Charlotte with lighter skin), which hung in all her homes until Oberon's own death in 1979.

Relationships and marriages
Oberon married director Alexander Korda in 1939. While married, she had a brief affair in 1941 with Richard Hillary, an RAF fighter pilot who had been badly burned in the Battle of Britain. They met while he was on a goodwill tour of the United States. He later wrote the best-selling autobiography, The Last Enemy. Oberon had an on-again, off-again affair with actor John Wayne from 1938 to 1947.

Oberon became Lady Korda when her husband was knighted in 1942 by George VI for his contribution to the war effort. At the time, the couple was based at Hills House in Denham, England. She divorced him in 1945 to marry cinematographer Lucien Ballard. Ballard devised a special camera light for her, to obscure on film her facial scars suffered in the 1937 accident. The light became known as the "Obie". She and Ballard divorced in 1949.

Oberon married Italian-born industrialist Bruno Pagliai in 1957, adopted two children with him and lived in Cuernavaca, Morelos, Mexico. In 1973, Oberon met then 36-year-old Dutch actor Robert Wolders while they filmed Interval. Oberon divorced Pagliai and married Wolders, who was 25 years her junior, in 1975.

Disputed birthplace
To avoid prejudice over her mixed background, Oberon created a "cover story" of being born and raised in Tasmania, Australia, and her birth records being destroyed in a fire. The story eventually unravelled after her death. Oberon is known to have been to Australia only twice. Her first visit was in 1965, on a film promotion. Another visit, to Hobart, was scheduled, but after journalists in Sydney pressed her for details of her early life, she became ill and shortly afterwards left for Mexico.

In 1978, the year before her death, she agreed to visit Hobart for a Lord Mayoral reception. The Lord Mayor of Hobart became aware shortly before the reception that there was no proof she had been born in Tasmania, but went ahead with the celebration to avoid embarrassment. Shortly after arriving at the reception, Oberon, to the disappointment of many, denied she had been born in Tasmania. She then excused herself claiming illness, and was unavailable to answer questions about her background. On the way to the reception, she had told her driver that as a child she was on a ship with her father, who became ill when it was passing Hobart. They were taken ashore so he could be treated, thereby spending some of her early years on the island. During her Hobart stay, she remained in her hotel, gave no other interviews, and did not visit the theatre named in her honour.

Death
Oberon retired after Interval and moved with Wolders to Malibu, California, where she died in 1979, aged 68, after suffering a stroke. Her body was interred at Forest Lawn Memorial Park Cemetery in Glendale, California.

Tributes
For her contributions to Motion Pictures, Oberon has a star on the Hollywood Walk of Fame at 6274 Hollywood Boulevard, Hollywood, California USA.

Michael Korda, nephew of Alexander Korda, wrote a roman à clef about Oberon after her death titled Queenie. This was adapted into a television miniseries starring Mia Sara.  

F. Scott Fitzgerald's unfinished novel The Last Tycoon was made into a television series with Jennifer Beals playing Margo Taft, a character created for the TV series and based on Oberon.

Filmography

Features

The Three Passions (1928) as Bit Part (uncredited)
The W Plan (1930) as Woman at Cafe Table (uncredited)
Alf's Button (1930) as Bit Part (uncredited)
A Warm Corner (1930) as Bit Part (uncredited)
Never Trouble Trouble (1931) as Bit Part (uncredited)
Fascination (1931) as Flower Seller (uncredited)
Service for Ladies (1932) as Minor Role (uncredited)
Ebb Tide (1932) as Girl (uncredited)
Aren't We All? (1932) as Bit Part (uncredited)
Wedding Rehearsal (1932) as Miss Hutchinson
Men of Tomorrow (1932) as Ysobel d'Aunay
For the Love of Mike (1932) as Bit Part (uncredited)
Strange Evidence (1933) as Bit Part (uncredited)
The Private Life of Henry VIII (1933) as Anne Boleyn - The Second Wife
The Battle (1934) as Marquise Yorisaka
The Broken Melody (1934) as Germaine Brissard
The Private Life of Don Juan (1934) as Antonita, a Dancer of Passionate Temperament
The Scarlet Pimpernel (1934) as Lady Blakeney
Folies Bergère de Paris (1935) as Baroness Genevieve Cassini
The Dark Angel (1935) as Kitty Vane (Academy Award nomination for Best Actress)
These Three (1936) as Karen Wright
Beloved Enemy (1936) as Lady Helen Drummond
I, Claudius (1937, unfinished) as Messalina
The Divorce of Lady X (1938) as Leslie
The Cowboy and the Lady (1938) as Mary Smith
Over the Moon (1939) as Jane Benson
Wuthering Heights (1939) as Cathy
The Lion Has Wings (1939) as Mrs. Richardson
'Til We Meet Again (1940) as Joan Ames
That Uncertain Feeling (1941) as Jill Baker
Affectionately Yours (1941) as Sue Mayberry
Lydia (1941) as Lydia MacMillan
Forever and a Day (1943) as Marjorie Ismay
Stage Door Canteen (1943) as Merle Oberon
First Comes Courage (1943) as Nicole Larsen
The Lodger (1944) as Kitty Langley
Dark Waters (1944) as Leslie Calvin
A Song to Remember (1945) as George Sand
This Love of Ours (1945) as Karin Touzac
Night in Paradise (1946) as Delarai
Temptation (1946) as Ruby
Night Song (1947) as Cathy
Berlin Express (1948) as Lucienne
Pardon My French (1951) as Elizabeth Rockwell
Dans la vie tout s'arrange (1952, a French version of The Lady from Boston) as Elizabeth Rockwell
24 Hours of a Woman's Life (1952) as Linda Venning
All Is Possible in Granada (1954) as Margaret Faulson
Désirée (1954) as Empress Josephine
Deep in My Heart (1954) as Dorothy Donnelly
 The Price of Fear (1956) as Jessica Warren
Of Love and Desire (1963) as Katherine Beckmann
The Oscar (1966) as herself
Hotel (1967) as The Duchess Caroline
Interval (1973) as Serena Moore (final film role)

Short subjects
 "Screen Snapshots Series 16, No. 4" (1936)
 "Hollywood Goes to Town" (1938)
 "Assignment: Foreign Legion" (1956/7 TV episodes)

Radio appearances

See also

 English rose (personal description)

References

Notes

Citations

Bibliography

 Bowden, Tim. The Devil in Tim: Penelope's Travels in Tasmania.  London: Allen & Unwin, 2008. . 
 Casey, Bob. Merle Oberon: Face of Mystery.  Hobart, Tasmania, Australia: Masterpiece@IXL, 2008. .
 Higham, Charles and Roy Moseley. Princess Merle: The Romantic Life of Merle Oberon. New York: Coward-McCann Inc., 1983. .
 Korda, Michael. Another Life: A Memoir of Other People. New York: Random House, 1999. .
 Munn, Michael. David Niven: The Man Behind the Balloon. London: JR Books, 2010. .
 Pybus, Cassandra. Till Apples Grow on an Orange Tree.  St Lucia, Australia: University of Queensland Press, 1998. .

External links

 
 
 
 Classic Movie Favorites website
 Photographs of Merle Oberon and bibliography
  – Note 1917 birthyear on headstone
 Merle Oberon in pose for The Dark Angel in Vanity Fair portrait by Cecil Beaton
 
 The Trouble With Merle (Australian documentary) – investigation of her origins

Anglo-Indian people
British people of Māori descent
Indian people of New Zealand descent
Sri Lankan people of New Zealand descent
English film actresses
English people of Sri Lankan descent
Actresses from Mumbai
Burials at Forest Lawn Memorial Park (Glendale)
1911 births
1979 deaths
20th-century English actresses
British people in colonial India
Wives of knights